Ugolino is an Italian masculine given name that is a diminutive form of Ugo. It may also refer to:

Artists and musicians

 Ugolino di Nerio (1280?–1349), Italian painter active in Siena and Florence
 Ugolino di Tedice (died after 1277), Italian painter
 Ugolino di Prete Ilario, 14th-century Italian painter from Siena
 Ugolino of Forlì (c. 1380–c. 1457), Italian composer and musical theorist

Other people

 Pope Gregory IX (born Ugolino di Conti; before 1170–1241))
 Ugolino da Gualdo Cattaneo (1200–1260), Italian Roman Catholic professed religious and friar of the Order of Saint Augustine
 Ugolino della Gherardesca (–1289), Italian nobleman who features prominently in Canto 32 of Dante's Inferno
 Ugolino of Gallura (Nino Visconti; died 1298), Sardinian judge
 Ugolino Brunforte (c. 1262–c. 1348), Italian Friar Minor and chronicler
 Ugolino de Vivaldo (fl. 1291), Genoese explorer
 Ugolino III Trinci, Lord of Foligno (1386–1415)
 Ugolino II Trinci, Lord of Foligno (1343–1353)

See also
 Ugolino and his sons (disambiguation)

Italian masculine given names
Italian names of Germanic origin